Monument Park (Afrikaans: Monumentpark) is a suburb of Pretoria, South Africa. It is at the start of the R21 Highway.

Education 
Monument Park houses a primary school only as Laerskool Monumentpark as an Afrikaans speaking school.

References

Suburbs of Pretoria